Rongotai is a New Zealand electorate, returning a single member to the New Zealand House of Representatives. The current MP for Rongotai is Paul Eagle of the Labour Party. He has held this position since the 2017 general election.

Population centres
The Rongotai electorate is centred on the southern and eastern suburbs of Wellington City. It stretches from Miramar in the east to take in the suburbs of Rongotai, Kilbirnie, Lyall Bay and Hataitai and runs from the south coast at Island Bay up through the southern section of the Brooklyn Hill to an east–west border next to Wellington Hospital in Newtown. Because Wellington Airport is within Rongotai's boundaries, the constituency also contains the Chatham Islands. It is named after the suburb of Rongotai which is roughly in its centre. Other suburbs include Berhampore, Ōwhiro Bay, Seatoun, and Roseneath.

A revision after 1996 pulled the boundary southwards, moving the suburbs around the Basin Reserve and the Massey University campus into the  electorate. In the 2002 redistribution, the area covered by the Rongotai electorate did not change. Changes to boundaries were done in the 2007 redistribution, but no further changes were done in the 2013/14 or 2019/20 redistributions.

History
Rongotai was one of the original 65 mixed-member proportional (MMP) representation electorates drawn in 1994 ahead of the 1996 election. It is the successor to the old  and  electorates, though the areas in these seats in the orbit of the central city were incorporated into a redrawn Wellington Central electorate.

In five out of the seven elections, Labour also won the party vote; the exception being in 1996 when National out-polled Labour by just 68 votes, and in 2014, when National's majority was 852 votes. After the 2014 election, he told his supporters that on current trends, he should be able to win the electorate by 2038.

King announced in March 2017 that she was stepping down from her role as Labour's deputy leader and would retire from politics at the 2017 general election. The electorate of Rongotai was won in the election by Paul Eagle, retaining it for Labour.

During the 2020 general election, Eagle retained Rongotai for Labour based on preliminary results. Eagle announced in June 2022 that he would contest the 2022 Wellington City mayoral election and should he be successful, he would resign from Parliament and trigger a by-election.

Members of Parliament
Unless otherwise stated, all MPs terms began and ended at general elections.

Key

List MPs
Members of Parliament elected from party lists in elections where that person also unsuccessfully contested the Rongotai electorate. Unless otherwise stated, all MPs terms began and ended at general elections.

Election results

2020 election

2017 election

2014 election

Electorate (as at 30 April 2016): 48,525

2011 election

Electorate (as at 26 November 2011): 46,153

2008 election

2005 election

1999 election
Refer to Candidates in the New Zealand general election 1999 by electorate#Rongotai for a list of candidates.

Table footnotes

References

External links
Electorate Profile  Parliamentary Library
 Election results for Rongotai at the 2005 election Elections New Zealand
 Election results for Rongotai at the 2002 election Elections New Zealand

New Zealand electorates
Politics of the Wellington Region
1996 establishments in New Zealand